Leo Breithaupt (July 9, 1914 – February 17, 1984) was an American racing driver from Los Angeles, California. Breithaupt raced Jalopies in the California Jalopy Association. He also competed in one NASCAR Grand National Series event in his career. That came in 1951, when Breithaupt competed at Gardena. Starting 15th in the twenty-car field, Breithaupt moved up to 9th place in the end of the day, scoring a top-ten and $75 in his only NASCAR race. He is the father of former Bicycle Motocross (BMX) racer, Scot Breithaupt.

References

1914 births
1984 deaths
NASCAR drivers
Racing drivers from Los Angeles